Super Group is an album by the Japanese rock trio Shonen Knife. It was released in Japan on 7 November 2008, in the USA on 20 May 2009, and in the UK and Europe in 2010. The original Japanese CD issue was released as a mini-LP cartoon package with a gatefold and poster inside.

The album contains Shonen Knife typical Ramones-like pop punk and a cover of Paul McCartney's tune "Jet".

Track listing

All tracks written by Naoko Yamano except "Jet," written by Paul and Linda McCartney, and "Top Of The World" by Richard Carpenter.

 "Super Group"
 "Slug"
 "Muddy Bubbles Hell"
 "Deer Biscuits"
 "BBQ Party"
 "Pyramid Power"
 "Time Warp"
 "Na Na Na"
 "Your Guitar"
 "Jet"
 "Top of the World"

Bonus tracks 
 "Evil Birds" (US version)
 "Lazybone (Live)" (UK version)
 "Muddy Bubbles Hell (Live)" (UK version)
 "Riding on the Rocket (Live)" (UK version)

Personnel 
Naoko Yamano - guitar, vocals
Ritsuko Taneda - bass, backing vocals
Etsuko Nakanishi - drums, backing vocals

References

External links
 
 Culturedeluxe review of the album.
 Good Charamel - North American Record Label for "Super Group"
 Damnably - European Record Label for "Super Group"

Shonen Knife albums
2008 albums
P-Vine Records albums